Chattanooga Sugar Babe is an album by the American musician Norman Blake, released in 1998.

The album was nominated for a Grammy Award, in the "Best Traditional Folk Album" category.

Critical reception
The Charleston Gazette called the album "dark, brooding, and brilliant," writing that Blake "plays and sings with a rough, reedy power closer in spirit to the dark holler laments of Bascom Lamar Lunsford and Dock Boggs than anyone currently living."

Track listing 
All songs by Norman Blake unless otherwise noted.
 "The Rescue from Moose River Goldmine" (Traditional) – 3:53
 "The Weathered Old Caboose Behind the Train" – 4:13
 "Ol' Bill Miner (The Gentleman Bandit)" – 5:56
 "Poor Old Dad" (Traditional) – 3:01
 "Chattanooga Sugar Babe" – 6:00
 "Platonia, the Pride of the Plains" (Traditional) – 5:13
 "Dr. Edmundo's Favorite Portuguese Waltz" – 4:37
 "The Founding of the Famous C.P.R." (Traditional) – 6:51
 "Paramount" – 6:25
 "Keep Smiling Old Pal" (Traditional) – 4:10
 "Balmullo House/Broke Down Gambler" (Traditional) – 3:22
 "Ragtime Texas" – 3:23
 "Chattanooga Rag" – 3:50
 "Dixie Flyer Blues" (Traditional) – 4:06

Personnel
Norman Blake – guitar, mandolin, banjo, fiddle, vocals

References

1998 albums
Norman Blake (American musician) albums